The Smothers Brothers Show is 
an American fantasy sitcom featuring the Smothers Brothers that aired on CBS on Friday nights at 9:30 p.m. ET from September 17, 1965, to April 22, 1966, co-sponsored by Alberto-Culver's VO5 hairdressing products and American Tobacco's Tareyton cigarettes. It was the first television show to feature the Smothers Brothers as regulars, following a series of night club and guest appearances. It lasted one season, consisting of 32 episodes.

It was the network's last situation comedy filmed in black-and-white; shortly after its final telecast, all CBS prime-time series were transmitted in color. In 1986, two decades after cancellation, reruns were seen  on Nick at Nite.

Synopsis
Dick Smothers played himself as a rising young executive at Pandora Publications, working for publisher Leonard J. Costello (Roland Winters). Brother Tom had been lost at sea two years earlier and now shows up as an apprentice angel assigned to do good deeds on Earth to earn his wings and become a full-fledged angel. Of course, Tom's efforts to help people never seem to work as planned and Dick had to help him clean up the mess. Tom received his orders from Ralph, his unseen and unheard boss. The series also featured Harriet MacGibbon as Mrs. Costello, and on occasion, Ann Elder as Dick's co-worker and girl friend Janet (Eileen O'Neill) also appeared in several episodes as another of Dick's girl friends, Wanda. As was typical of the Smothers Brothers in The Smothers Brothers Comedy Hour, Dick was typically the straight man to Tom's humorous antics.

Creative control struggles

The series was produced by Four Star Television in association with the brothers' Knave Productions (named for Tom's catchphrase "Curb Your Tongue, Knave!", and the title of their 1963 record album).

This series may have inspired the Brothers' more successful later series The Smothers Brothers Comedy Hour in that Tom Smothers had been critical of the series as not being compatible with the brothers' strengths (in fact, he fought with Four Star executives over more creative control of the series, earning an ulcer and irritating his marital relationship to the point of divorce at the end of the season).

For instance, neither brother played their instruments on the show (with one exception, at the beginning of "'Twas The Week Before Christmas" episode), and it was not until halfway through the season that they sang the theme song.

Episodes

References

External links
 
 Link to theme song

1965 American television series debuts
1966 American television series endings
1960s American sitcoms
American fantasy television series
Angels in television
Black-and-white American television shows
CBS original programming
English-language television shows
Fantasy comedy television series
Television series about brothers
Television series by Four Star Television
Television series by 20th Century Fox Television
Television series created by Aaron Spelling